Phthorimaea interjuncta is a moth in the family Gelechiidae. It was described by Edward Meyrick in 1931. It is found in Brazil.

References

Phthorimaea
Moths described in 1931